Landmarks of the Nebraska Territory were important to settlers on the Oregon, California and Mormon trails. While the majority of the landmarks were close to the Platte River, others were spread across the state.

The trails

Landmarks in the Nebraska Territory were often related to their proximity to the several trails that crossed the area. The Oregon and California Trails entered the Territory from the Kansas Territory Kansas at Gage County. They continue west/northwesterly across present-day Nebraska. The Mormon Trail entered the Nebraska Territory at Cutler's Park, across the Missouri River from Kanesville, Iowa. It continued westerly along the Elkhorn and Platte Rivers.

Landmarks

See also
 History of Nebraska

References

Landmarks in Nebraska
Pre-statehood history of Nebraska
Tourist attractions in Nebraska
Nebraska Territory